This is a list of abbreviations relating to climate change causation, adaptation and mitigation.

A
ADP - Ad Hoc Working Group on the Durban Platform for Enhanced Action
AGN - African Group of Negotiators
APA - Ad Hoc Working Group on the Paris Agreement 
APP - Asia-Pacific Partnership on Clean Development and Climate
AR4 - Fourth Assessment Report of the IPCC (2007)
AR5 - Fifth Assessment Report of the IPCC (2014)
AR5 SYR - Synthesis Report of AR5  
AR6 - Sixth Assessment Report of the IPCC (published on 9 August 2021)
AWG-KP - Ad Hoc Working Group on further Commitments for Annex I Parties under the Kyoto Protocol 
AWG-LCA -  Ad Hoc Working Group on Long-term Cooperative Action
AYCC - Australian Youth Climate Coalition

B
BAP - Bali Action Plan

C
C&C - Contraction & Convergence, a global CO2 emissions management model promoted by the Global Commons Institute
CAIT - The World Resources Institute's Climate Data Explorer archive 
CAPP - Climate Action Pacific Partnership 
CAPP II - Climate Action Pacific Partnership (CAPP) Conference II – 2018
CAPP III - Third meeting of the Climate Action Pacific Partnership Conference (29-30 April 2019)
CCA - Climate Change Agreement (UK)
CCAFS - Climate Change, Agriculture and Food Security Research Program 
CCAF - Climate Change Action Fund (Australia)
CCC - Committee on Climate Change (UK)
CCCEP - Centre for Climate Change Economics and Policy
CCCR - Canada's Changing Climate Report
CCCS - Centre for Climate Change Studies, University of Dar es Salaam
CCF - The Scottish Government's Climate Challenge Fund
CCIA - Climate Change in Australia
CC:iNet - Climate Change Information Network 
CCL - Climate Change Levy (UK)
CCl2F2 - Dichlorodifluoromethane (greenhouse gas)
CCLS - Cambridge Climate Lecture Series
CCRA - Climate Change Risk Assessment 
CCS - Carbon Capture and Storage
CDM - Clean Development Mechanism
CDP - Organisation formerly known as the Carbon Disclosure Project
CDR - Carbon dioxide removal
CER - Certified Emission Reduction
CFC - Chlorofluorocarbon
CFRF - Climate Financial Risk Forum (UK)
CF4 - Carbon tetrafluoride or tetrafluoromethane (greenhouse gas)
CGE - Consultative Group of Experts 
CHClF2 - Chlorodifluoromethane (greenhouse gas)
CH4 - Methane
CINC - Interdepartmental Committee of Climate Negotiators
CLP - Carbon Literacy Project
CMA - Meeting of the Parties to the Paris Agreement
CMA1 - First meeting of the Parties to the Paris Agreement (7-18 November 2016)
CMA1.2 - The second part of the first session of the Conference of the meeting of the Parties to the Paris Agreement (6-17 November 2017)
CMA1.3 - The third part of the first session of the Conference of the meeting of the Parties to the Paris Agreement (2-14 December 2018)
CMA2 - Second meeting of the Parties to the Paris Agreement (2–13 December 2019)
CMA3 - Third meeting of the Parties to the Paris Agreement (postponed to 1–12 December 2021)
CMIP - Coupled Model Intercomparison Project
CMIP5 - Coupled Model Intercomparison Project, Phase 5 
CMP - Conference of the Parties Serving as the Meeting of Parties to the Kyoto Protocol
CMP9 - 9th meeting of the Parties to the Kyoto Protocol (11-23 November 2013)
CMP10 - 10th meeting of the Parties to the Kyoto Protocol (1-12 December 2014)
CMP11 - 11th meeting of the Parties to the Kyoto Protocol (30 November-12 December 2015)
CMP12 - 12th meeting of the Parties to the Kyoto Protocol (7-18 November 2016)
CMP13 - 13th meeting of the Parties to the Kyoto Protocol (6-17 November 2017)
CMP14 - 14th meeting of the Parties to the Kyoto Protocol (2-15 December 2018)
CMP15 - 15th meeting of the Parties to the Kyoto Protocol (2–13 December 2019)
CMP16 - 16th meeting of the Parties to the Kyoto Protocol (postponed to 1–12 December 2021)
CNZ - Carbon Net Zero 
CO2 - Carbon dioxide
CO2-e - Carbon dioxide equivalent, also CO2-eq 
CoM - Covenant of Mayors for Climate and Energy (Europe) 
COP - Conference of the Parties [to the UNFCCC]
COP1 - First UNFCCC Conference of the Parties (28 March to 7 April 1995)
COP2 - Second UNFCCC Conference of the Parties (8-18 July 1996)
COP3 - Third UNFCCC Conference of the Parties (1-10 December 1997) 
COP4 - Fourth UNFCCC Conference of the Parties (2-14 November 1998)
COP5 - Fifth UNFCCC Conference of the Parties (25 October to 5 November 1999)
COP6 - Sixth UNFCCC Conference of the Parties (13–25 November 2000)
COP6-bis - Resumed Session of COP6 (16-27 July 2001) 
COP7 - Seventh UNFCCC Conference of the Parties (29 October - 10 November 2001)
COP8 - Eighth UNFCCC Conference of the Parties (23 October - 1 November 2002)
COP9 - Ninth UNFCCC Conference of the Parties (1-12 December 2003)
COP10 - Tenth UNFCCC Conference of the Parties (6-14 December 2004)
COP11 - Eleventh UNFCCC Conference of the Parties (28 November - 9 December 2005)
COP12 - Twelfth UNFCCC Conference of the Parties (6-17 November 2006)
COP13 - 13th UNFCCC Conference of the Parties (3-15 December 2007)
COP14 - 14th UNFCCC Conference of the Parties (1-12 December 2008)
COP15 - 15th UNFCCC Conference of the Parties (7-18 December 2009)
COP16 - 16th UNFCCC Conference of the Parties (29 November - 10 December 2010)
COP17 - 17th UNFCCC Conference of the Parties (28 November - 11 December 2011)
COP18 - 18th UNFCCC Conference of the Parties (26 November - 6 December 2012)
COP19 - 19th UNFCCC Conference of the Parties (11-23 November 2013)
COP20 - 20th UNFCCC Conference of the Parties (1-12 December 2014)
COP21 - 21st UNFCCC Conference of the Parties (30 November-12 December 2015)
COP22 - 22nd UNFCCC Conference of the Parties (7-18 November 2016)
COP23 - 23rd UNFCCC Conference of the Parties (6-17 November 2017)
COP24 - 24th UNFCCC Conference of the Parties (2-15 December 2018)
COP25 - 25th UNFCCC Conference of the Parties (2-13 December 2019)
COP26 - 26th UNFCCC Conference of the Parties (1-12 November 2021)
COP27 - 27th UNFCCC Conference of the Parties (6-18 November 2022)
COP28 - 28th UNFCCC Conference of the Parties, scheduled for November 2023 in the United Arab Emirates 
COP29 - 29th UNFCCC Conference of the Parties, 2024, proposed venue is Australia 
COP30 - anticipated 2025 UNFCCC Conference of the Parties 
CORSIA - Carbon Offsetting and Reduction Scheme for International Aviation
CPA - Carbon Pricing Act (Singapore)
CPRS - Carbon Pollution Reduction Scheme (Australia)
CRC - CRC Energy Efficiency Scheme, formerly Carbon Reduction Commitment (UK)
CREWS - Climate Risk and Early Warning Systems 
CRU - Climatic Research Unit at the University of East Anglia 
CRU TS - Climatic Research Unit Time Series datasets 
CSA - Climate-Smart Agriculture
CVF - Climate Vulnerable Forum

D
DECC - Department of Energy and Climate Change (UK), now Department for Business, Energy and Industrial Strategy

E
ECI - Environmental Change Institute at the University of Oxford
ETC - Energy Transition Council 
ETS - Emissions Trading System
ETSWAP - Emissions Trading Scheme Workflow Automation Project operated by the UK's Environment Agency

F
FAR - First Assessment Report of the IPCC (1990)
F-gas - Fluorinated gas 
FICER - Fund for Innovative Climate and Energy Research
FOLU - Forestry and other land use
FFF - Fridays for Future

G
GCF - Green Climate Fund
GCoM - Global Covenant of Mayors for Climate and Energy
GHG - Greenhouse gas
GtC - Gigatonnes of carbon
GWP - Global warming potential

H
HadCM3 - Hadley Centre Coupled Model, version 3
HadGEM - Hadley Centre Global Environmental Model
HadGEM1 - 
HCFC - Hydrochlorofluorocarbon
HFC - Hydrofluorocarbon

I
ICLEI - International Council for Local Environmental Initiatives
IPCC - Intergovernmental Panel on Climate Change
IPCC-50 - the IPCC's 50th session (2019)
IPCC-NGGIP - IPCC National Greenhouse Gas Inventories Programme
ISO 1406x Series - ISO standards for climate change mitigation
ISO 14090:2019 - ISO standard for adaptation to climate change — Principles, requirements and guidelines
ISO/DIS 14091 - Adaptation to climate change — Guidelines on vulnerability, impacts and risk assessment
ISO/TS 14092 - Adaptation to climate change — Requirements and guidance on adaptation planning for local governments and communities

J
JI - Joint Implementation

K
KLD - Ministry of Climate and Environment (Klima- og miljødepartementet), Norway

L
LCDI - Low Carbon Development Indonesia 
LDCF - Least Developed Countries Fund 
LECBP - Low Emission Capacity Building Programme 
LEDS - Low-Emission Development Strategies
LSCE - Laboratoire des sciences du climat et de l'environnement, Gif-sur-Yvette, France
LULUCF - Land use, land-use change, and forestry

M
MCC - Mercator Research Institute on Global Commons and Climate Change, Berlin
MPGCA - Marrakech Partnership for Global Climate Action
MoCC - Ministry of Climate Change (Pakistan)
MoEFCC - Ministry of Environment, Forest and Climate Change (India)
MOP1 - 1st Meeting of the Parties to the Kyoto Protocol (28 November - 9 December 2005)
MOP2 - 2nd Meeting of the Parties to the Kyoto Protocol (6-17 November 2006)
MOP3 - 3rd Meeting of the Parties to the Kyoto Protocol (3-15 December 2007)
MOP4 - 4th Meeting of the Parties to the Kyoto Protocol (1-12 December 2008)
MOP5 - 5th Meeting of the Parties to the Kyoto Protocol (7-18 December 2009)
MWE/CCD - Climate Change Department of the Ministry of Water and Environment (Uganda)

N
NAMA - Nationally Appropriate Mitigation Actions
NAPA - National Adaptation Programme of Action
NAZCA - Non-state Actor Zone for Climate Action
NC - National Communication (under the Paris Agreement) 
NDC - Nationally Determined Contributions
NECIA - Northeast Climate Impacts Assessment (USA) 
N2O - Nitrous Oxide
NRSP - National Reports Submission Portal

O
O3 - Ozone

P
PATPA - Partnership on Transparency in the Paris Agreement 
P-CAN - Place-based Climate Action Networks, a UK-based partnership between university researchers and the public, private and third sectors in tackling climate change, aiming to accelerate and sustain the transition to a low-carbon, climate-resilient society through the creation of local climate commissions.
PCD - Petersberg Climate Dialogue
PCD X - Petersberg Climate Dialogue 10 (13-14 May 2019) 
PCD XI - Petersberg Climate Dialogue (27-28 April 2020)
PFC - Perfluorocarbon
PIK - Potsdam Institute for Climate Impact Research

S
SAR - Second Assessment Report of the IPCC (1995)
SB 52 -  Fifty-second session of the Subsidiary Body for Scientific and Technological Advice (SBSTA 52) and the fifty-second session of the Subsidiary Body for Implementation (SBI 52) (postponed to 2021) 
SB 56 - the Bonn Climate Change Conference, 56th session of the subsidiary bodies, held on 6 to 16 June 2022 
SBI - Subsidiary Body for Implementation
SBI 46 - Forth-sixth session of the Subsidiary Body for Implementation (8-18 May 2017)
SBI 47 - Forty-seventh session of the Subsidiary Body for Implementation (6-15 November 2017)
SBI 52 - Fifty-second session of the Subsidiary Body for Implementation (postponed to 2021) 
SBSTA - Subsidiary Body for Scientific and Technological Advice
SBTi - Science Based Targets initiative 
SCCF - Special Climate Change Fund 
SDA - Sectoral Decarbonization Approach
SDGs - Sustainable Development Goals
SECR - Streamlined Energy and Carbon Reporting framework (UK)
SF6 - Sulfur hexafluoride
SRCCL - Special Report on Climate Change and Land of the IPCC
SRES - Special Report on Emissions Scenarios of the IPCC
SR15 - IPCC's Special Report on Global Warming of 1.5 °C
SSP - Shared Socioeconomic Pathway

T
TACC - Territorial Approach to Climate Change
TAR - Third Assessment Report of the IPCC (2001)
TCCC - Tarawa Climate Change Conference
TCFD - Task Force on Climate-related Financial Disclosures 
tCO2 - Tonnes of carbon dioxide equivalent
TD - Talanoa Dialogue
TFI - Task Force on National Greenhouse Gas Inventories

U
UKCIP - Multi-disciplinary team formerly known as the UK Climate Impacts Programme, based at the Environmental Change Institute at the University of Oxford
UKCP - UK Climate Projections
UKCP09 - UK Climate Projections 2009 
UKCP18 - UK Climate Projections 2018 
UKHACC - UK Health Alliance on Climate Change
UN CC:Learn - One UN Climate Change Learning Partnership
UNEP - United Nations Environment Programme
UNFCCC - United Nations Framework Convention on Climate Change
USCAP - U.S. Climate Action Partnership

W
WCI - Western Climate Initiative
WCRP - World Climate Research Programme
WGI - Working Group I of the IPCC, which assesses the physical science of climate change
WGII - Working Group II of the IPCC, which assesses the vulnerability of socio-economic and natural systems to climate change
WGIII - Working Group III of the IPCC, which "focuses on climate change mitigation, assessing methods for reducing greenhouse gas emissions, and removing greenhouse gases from the atmosphere".
WIM - Warsaw International Mechanism for Loss and Damage associated with Climate Change Impacts
WMO - World Meteorological Organization
WRI - World Resources Institute

Numerical
4CMR - Former Cambridge Centre for Climate Change Mitigation Research

Notes

References

climate
Climate change